Ventimiglia di Sicilia (Sicilian: Calamigna) is a town and comune in the Metropolitan City of Palermo, located in the autonomous region of Sicily, Italy. Though "Ventimiglia di Sicilia" is its official name, in Sicilian, the city is known as Calamigna.

Ventimiglia was founded in the 1620s by Don Girolamo del Carretto. The town was named after his wife, Beatrice Ventimiglia. In 1863, "di Sicilia" was added to Ventimiglia, to differentiate the city from the town of Ventimiglia in Liguria. The city is neighbored by the towns Baucina, Bolognetta, Caccamo, Casteldaccia and Ciminna.

The town is also home to an advanced observatory, the Osservatorio di Ventimiglia di Sicilia "Ezio Brancato" (Ventimiglia di Sicilia Observatory) run by The Organizzazione Ricerche e Studi di Astronomia (Organization for the Research and Study of Astronomy) or ORSA, built in 2001.

There is also an emigrant community from the town in New York City. They have a plot with graves for members of the “Club di Figli Maria SS Rosario / Ventimiglia Sicula” in the “Second Calvary” section of Calvary Cemetery in Queens , New York City.

References

External links
 ORSA Observatory Link
 Official Site

Municipalities of the Metropolitan City of Palermo